Azerbaijan competed at the 2016 Summer Olympics in Rio de Janeiro, Brazil, from 5 to 21 August 2016. This was the nation's sixth consecutive appearance at the Summer Olympics in the post-Soviet era.

The National Olympic Committee of the Azerbaijani Republic fielded a team of 56 athletes, 42 men and 14 women, across 14 sports at the Games. Azerbaijan made its Olympic debut in four sports (archery, slalom canoeing, track cycling, and triathlon). It was the nation's largest ever delegation sent to the Olympics in its independent history, beating the record of 53 athletes who attended the London Games four years earlier. More than 60 percent of the nation's roster were born outside of Azerbaijan; several of them hailed from Eastern Europe, particularly from Russia and Ukraine. For the first time in history, Azerbaijan was not represented in the weightlifting, as the International Weightlifting Federation decided to strip of its quota places over "multiple positive cases" of doping.

The Azerbaijani roster featured 36 rookies and 20 returning Olympians. Of the returnees, nine of them won Olympic medals in London, including defending wrestling champions Toghrul Asgarov and Sharif Sharifov, freestyle wrestlers Mariya Stadnik and Yuliya Ratkevich, four-time kayak sprint medalist Inna Osypenko-Radomska, who represented her native Ukraine at four previous editions (2000 to 2012) before transferring her allegiance to Azerbaijan in 2014, and boxers Magomedrasul Majidov (super heavyweight) and European Games champion Teymur Mammadov (light heavyweight), who was selected by the committee to lead the delegation as the flag bearer in the opening ceremony.

Azerbaijan left Rio de Janeiro with a total of 18 medals (1 gold, 7 silver, and 10 bronze), signifying the nation's most successful Olympic outcome in its independent history. Nine of these medals were distributed to the Azerbaijani team in wrestling, three in taekwondo for the first time, and two each in boxing, sprint canoeing, and judo. Among the nation's medalists were Stadnik, who managed to repeat her silver from London; Osypenko-Radomska, who extended her career haul with a bronze medal and fifth overall, and taekwondo fighter Radik Isayev (men's +80 kg), who secured Azerbaijan's only gold-medal triumph at the Games.

Medalists

| width=78% align=left valign=top |

| width=22% align=left valign=top |

Competitors
The following is the list of number of competitors participating in the Games:

Archery

One Azerbaijani archer has qualified for the women's individual recurve at the Olympics by securing one of three available Olympic spots at the 2016 European Championships in Nottingham, Great Britain, signifying the nation's Olympic debut in the sport.

Athletics

 
Azerbaijani athletes have so far achieved qualifying standards in the following athletics events (up to a maximum of 3 athletes in each event):

Track & road events

Field events

Boxing

Azerbaijan has entered eleven boxers to compete in the following weight classes into the Olympic boxing tournament. Parviz Baghirov was the only Azerbaijani boxer to be selected to the Olympic team with a top two finish of his respective division in the World Series of Boxing, while 2012 Olympian Elvin Mamishzada and Russian import Albert Selimov had secured their places at the 2015 World Championships.

Five further boxers (Chalabiyev, Sotomayor, Abdullayev, Majidov, and Alekseevna) had claimed their Olympic spots at the 2016 European Qualification Tournament in Samsun, Turkey. Meanwhile, Kamran Shakhsuvarly, Youth Olympic light flyweight champion Rufat Huseynov, London 2012 bronze medalist Teymur Mammadov secured additional places on the Azerbaijani roster to complete the Olympic boxing lineup at the 2016 AIBA World Qualifying Tournament in Baku.

Men

Women

Canoeing

Slalom
Azerbaijani canoeists have qualified a maximum of one boat in each of the following classes through the 2015 ICF Canoe Slalom World Championships.

Sprint
Azerbaijani canoeists has qualified one boat in each of the following events through the 2015 ICF Canoe Sprint World Championships.

Qualification Legend: FA = Qualify to final (medal); FB = Qualify to final B (non-medal)

Cycling

Road
Azerbaijan has qualified one rider in the men's Olympic road race by virtue of his top 200 individual ranking in the 2015 UCI Europe Tour. One additional spot was awarded to the Azerbaijani cyclist in the women's road race by virtue of her top 100 individual placement in the 2016 UCI World Rankings.

Track
Following the completion of the 2016 UCI Track Cycling World Championships, Azerbaijan has entered one rider to compete only in both women's sprint and keirin at the Olympics, by virtue of her final individual UCI Olympic rankings in those events.

Sprint

Keirin

Fencing

Azerbaijan has entered one fencer into the Olympic competition. 2012 Olympian Sabina Mikina had claimed the sole Olympic spot as the winner of the women's sabre at the European Zonal Qualifier in Prague, Czech Republic.

Gymnastics

Artistic

Azerbaijan has entered one artistic gymnast into the Olympic competition. 2012 Olympian Oleg Stepko had claimed an Olympic spot in the men's apparatus and all-around events at the 2015 World Championships in Glasgow, while Petro Pakhnyuk did so at the Olympic Test Event in Rio de Janeiro.

Men

Rhythmic 
Azerbaijan has qualified one rhythmic gymnast for the individual all-around by finishing in the top 15 at the 2015 World Championships in Stuttgart, Germany.

Judo

Azerbaijan has qualified a total of six judokas for each of the following weight classes at the Games by virtue of their top 22 national finish for men in the IJF World Ranking List of 30 May 2016.

Rowing

Azerbaijan has qualified one boat in the men's double sculls for the Olympics at the 2015 FISA World Championships.

Qualification Legend: FA=Final A (medal); FB=Final B (non-medal); FC=Final C (non-medal); FD=Final D (non-medal); FE=Final E (non-medal); FF=Final F (non-medal); SA/B=Semifinals A/B; SC/D=Semifinals C/D; SE/F=Semifinals E/F; QF=Quarterfinals; R=Repechage

Shooting
 
Azerbaijan has received an invitation from ISSF to send Ruslan Lunev in both the men's air and rapid fire pistol to the Olympics, as long as the minimum qualifying score (MQS) was met by 31 March 2016.

Qualification Legend: Q = Qualify for the next round; q = Qualify for the bronze medal (shotgun)

Swimming

Azerbaijan has received a Universality invitation from FINA to send two swimmers (one male and one female) to the Olympics.

Taekwondo

 
Azerbaijan entered a full squad of four athletes into the taekwondo competition at the Olympics. Radik Isayev qualified automatically for the men's heavyweight category (+80 kg) by finishing in the top 6 WTF Olympic rankings. European Games medalists Milad Beigi, Patimat Abakarova, and 2012 Olympian Farida Azizova secured the remaining spots on the Azerbaijani team by virtue of their top two finish respectively in the men's welterweight (80 kg), women's flyweight (49 kg) and women's welterweight category (67 kg) at the 2016 European Qualification Tournament in Istanbul, Turkey.

Triathlon

Azerbaijan has entered one triathlete to compete at the Games, signifying the nation's Olympic debut in the sport. Russian-born Rostyslav Pevtsov was ranked among the top 40 eligible triathletes in the men's event based on the ITU Olympic Qualification List as of 15 May 2016.

Wrestling

Azerbaijan has qualified a total of fourteen wrestlers for each of the following weight classes into the Olympic competition. Majority of Olympic berths were awarded to Azerbaijani wrestlers by virtue of their top six finish at the 2015 World Championships, while one of them had claimed an Olympic spot in men's freestyle 74 kg with a semifinal triumph at the 2016 European Qualification Tournament.

Two further wrestlers had claimed the remaining Olympic slots to round out the Azerbaijani roster in separate World Qualification Tournaments; one of them in men's freestyle 57 kg at the initial meet in Ulaanbaatar, while the other in men's Greco-Roman 66 kg at the final meet in Istanbul.

See also
Azerbaijan at the 2016 Summer Paralympics

References

External links 

 

Olympics
2016
Nations at the 2016 Summer Olympics